Saint-Bruno-de-Kamouraska is a municipality in the Canadian province of Quebec, located in the Kamouraska Regional County Municipality.

Municipal council
 Mayor: Gilles Bois
 Councillors: Gérard Dionne, Ghislain Dionne, Michel Gagné, Donald Larochelle, Denise Lévesque, André Simard

See also
 List of municipalities in Quebec

References

External links
 

Municipalities in Quebec
Incorporated places in Bas-Saint-Laurent